The ship that became the first HMS Resolution was a 50-gun third-rate frigate built under the 1652 Programme for the navy of the Commonwealth of England by Sir Phineas Pett at Ratcliffe, and launched in 1654 under the name Tredagh (Tredagh is an alternative name for the Irish town of Drogheda, scene of the Siege of Drogheda, a Roundhead victory, during the English Civil War).

After the Restoration in 1660, Tredagh was renamed HMS Resolution. On 25 February 1665 (Julian calendar, then still in use; 7 March 1666 in the Gregorian calendar) Resolution fought in the Battle of Lowestoft as the flagship of Rear Admiral Robert Sansum. On 25 July 1666 Julian (4 August 1666 Gregorian) she fought in the St. James's Day Battle under the command of Captain Willoughby Hannam as the flagship of Rear Admiral Sir John Harman. In the battle she ran aground and was burnt by a Dutch fireship.

Notes

References
 Lavery, Brian (2003) The Ship of the Line - Volume 1: The development of the battlefleet 1650-1850. Conway Maritime Press. .

Ships of the line of the Royal Navy
Ships built on the River Thames
1650s ships
Maritime incidents in 1666
Ships of the English navy
Speaker-class ships of the line